Culinary specialist (abbreviated CS) is a United States Navy occupational rating. The rating was created on January 15, 2004 from the mess management specialist (MS) rating.

History
Food service ratings in the U.S. Navy were historically divided into two broad groupings until the merger of commissaryman and steward ratings to mess management specialist on January 1, 1975. Before 1975, stewards prepared and served meals to the officers, maintained their quarters and took care of their uniforms. They served officers in the flag mess for admirals, the cabin mess for the ship's captain and the wardroom mess for all other officers. Until the merger, the steward rating, and its predecessor ratings were largely segregated. Sailors of African and Asian descent largely performed these functions.

Commissarymen prepared meals for enlisted sailors in galleys on the ship and shore bases in the general mess. They purchased food from approved sources, stored food stuffs and distributed to the galleys for preparation and kept accountability records.

With the consolidation, sailors in the new rating became "responsible for food preparation and food service for both enlisted and officer messes." To accommodate the change, officers were now required to assume some of the upkeep of their staterooms and personal uniforms. Other cleaning duties became the responsibility of rotational pool of enlisted personnel from the ship. This arrangement continues with the current culinary specialist rating.  Enlisted personal from other ratings in pay grades E-1 to E-3 are usually required to do two tours lasting first 90 and then 60 days.  This practice is somewhat derisively referred to as "Mess Cranking".

In an effort to make mess management specialist (MS) translate to the civilian sector, the rating title was updated to culinary specialist (CS) in 2004. This change allowed for easier recruiting tactics when giving job descriptions related to various civilian jobs with similar titles. It also provided sailors transitioning into the civilian sector an opportunity to use their culinary certifications that would now correlate into numerous career paths, including food production methods, cost control, nutrition, sanitation, and food marketing. The Culinary Specialist rating now belongs to approximately 7,500 food service personnel who feed over 300,000 US Navy sailors worldwide.

Duties
Culinary specialists operate and manage U.S. Navy messes and living quarters in addition to many other duties as follows:
 Estimate quantities and kinds of foodstuffs required.
 Assist supply officers in ordering and storage of subsistence items and procurement of equipment and mess gear.
 Check delivery for quantity and assist medical personnel in inspection for quality.
 Prepare menus and plan, prepare, and serve meals.
 Maintain food service spaces and associated equipment in a clean and sanitary condition, including storerooms and refrigerated spaces.
 Maintain records of financial transactions and submit required reports.
 Maintain, oversee, and manage quarters afloat and ashore.

Navy culinary specialists operate messes for the President of the United States in the White House and at Camp David.

See also
Jack of the dust
List of United States Navy ratings

References

External links

 Rating restrictions for Filipinos

United States Navy ratings
Military food of the United States